Manny Calonzo is an environmental advocate. Aided by the Ecological Waste Coalition of the Philippines (EcoWaste)  – in which he served as their former president and advisor – he was responsible for the Philippine government’s law to nationally ban lead paint (culminating in 85% lead-certified paint there since 2017) and the creation of a third-party certification program for paint manufacturers. His anti-toxic campaign extended to other substances in footwear items which potentially decreased fertility in men and harmed fetuses. In 2018 he was one of seven international Goldman Environmental Prize winners – a decade after he began his national campaign – which resulted in the protection of millions of Filipino children. Calonzo is a consultant on the Global Lead Paint Elimination Campaign at the International Persistent Organic Pollutants Elimination Network.

References

Living people
Year of birth missing (living people)
Place of birth missing (living people)
Filipino environmentalists
Organization founders
Goldman Environmental Prize awardees